Muslim Mulliqi (1934 – 13 January 1998) was an impressionist and expressionist painter of Kosovo. Born into a family of artists in town, Mulliqi attended the Academy of Fine Arts in Belgrade under Zoran Petrović, where he also continued with the postgraduate studies.
Mulliqi exposed in galleries of Kosovo, ex-Yugoslavia, Italy and Albania. Mulliqi was the initiator of the foundation and vice-president of the Academy of Sciences and Arts of Kosovo. He taught painting in the Faculty of Arts at the University of Prishtina. Kosovo Art Gallery exhibition holds his name. While his creations are everlasting, academic Mulliqi was and will remain one of the most prominent figures of the Albanian art. He died in 1998 in Prishtina.

His work is characterized by bold use of colors, firm rhythm, endless space, influenced by his native Dukagjin region.

Exhibitions
Mulliqi exhibitions include:
Pallati i Kulturës, Gjakovë(1952)
Foajeu i Teatrit Popullor, Prishtinë(1956, 1960, 1965) 
Pallati i Kulturës, Smederevo; Galeria e Shtëpisë së APJ-së, Tuzla, Rieka, Pula(1967) 
Foajeu i Teatrit Popullor, Prishtinë(1969)
Salloni i Vogël Figurativ, Novi Sad(1970) 
Galeria e APJ-së, Beograd(1973)
Galeria "Gjuro Sallaj", Beograd(1974)Galeria "Heleoart", Rome(1975) Galeria e Arteve, Prishtinë(1979) Klubi i Artistëve, Prishtinë; Galeria Bashkëkohore, Podgorica(1980)Pallati i Kulturës, Banja Luka(1981) Galeria "Forum", Zagreb(1982, 1991)Galeria e Vogël, Ljubljana(1984) Galeria e Shtëpisë së APJ-së, Beograd(1986) Galeria Moderne, Budva(1987)Galeria e KO, Grožnjan(1989, 1990)La Galerie, Pejë, Galeria Kombëtare e Arteve, Tirana(1993) Galeria "Evropa", Pejë, Galeria "Roma", Prishtinë.(1996)

Awards
Muslim Mulliqi has received the following awards:

1990, The First Prize for Painting1974, Salon Prize1974, Purchasing Prize1973, Cetinje's Salon Purchasing Prize1969, KAFA's Prize1968, The Belgrade's Academy of Arts Purchasing Prize1965, Prishtina City November Prize1954, Kosova's December Prize ''

References

See also
Kosova National Art Gallery
Rexho Mulliqi
Albanians in Kosovo

Kosovo Albanians
Artists from Gjakova
1934 births
1998 deaths
20th-century Albanian painters
Albanian artists
Members of the Academy of Sciences and Arts of Kosovo